HMS Orpheus (N46) was an O-class submarine of the Royal Navy. She was laid down by William Beardmore and Company on the Clyde on 14 April 1927, launched on 26 February 1929 and commissioned on 23 September 1930.

Loss

References

Odin-class submarines of the Royal Navy
1929 ships
Ships built on the River Clyde
World War II submarines of the United Kingdom
Maritime incidents in June 1940
World War II shipwrecks in the Mediterranean Sea
Submarines sunk by Italian warships